Partia Fryma e Re (FeR) was a political party in Kosovo. It was founded and registered with the Central Elections Committee in October 2010 by Harvard University graduate Shpend Ahmeti, Ilir Deda, Director of the Kosovo Institute for Policy Research and Development (KIPRED) and others, and supports Kosovo in becoming a new generation political state. "We do not distinguish citizens based on where they come from... they are individuals and everyone will be represented without distinction," stated Deda. FER participated in the 2010 general elections in Kosovo on 12 December.

Although the party got some hype on various social media platforms, it fared badly in the 2010 election, receiving 2% of the vote and not passing the 5% threshold which would allow them into parliament.

It merged into Vetëvendosje! on 31 March 2011.

References

External links
https://web.archive.org/web/20101011103604/http://www.partiafer.com/
FER in Facebook

2010 establishments in Kosovo
2011 disestablishments in Kosovo
Centrist parties in Kosovo
Defunct political parties in Kosovo
Liberal parties in Kosovo
Political parties disestablished in 2011
Political parties established in 2010